Kjárr, or Kíarr, is a figure of Germanic heroic legend that is believed to be the reflection of the Roman Emperors. In Old Norse sources, he appears as a king of the Valir (Celtic/Romance southerners) who were the people of Valland (the Celtic/Roman south).

Many scholars have suggested that the name is derived from Caesar, but the exact path from Caesar to Kíarr is not clear.

Origin

In his Skáldskaparmál, Snorri Sturluson lists Kjárr as a descendant of Auði, the founder of the Ödling dynasty:

In the genealogy section of Hversu Noregr byggðist, further information is provided about Auði and Kjarr. It presents Auði as the grandfather of Kjarr and as an early ruler of the Celtic/Romance southerners:

Kjárr and his daughter Ölrún also appear in the Völundarkviða, where she is a Valkyrie who marries the master archer Egil, the brother of Wayland the Smith:

There are two other references which both place Kjarr far back in time as a contemporary of the Huns during the Age of Migrations. One of these is a poem in the Poetic Edda named Atlakviða:

The second reference is in the Hervarar saga which contains a reference to Kíarr in a poem in fornyrðislag which lists the great kings of old:

The few appearances of Kjárr stand out from the general lack of references to the Romans in the literary sources of the Germanic peoples before the arrival of Christianity.

Etymology

Many scholars have suggested that the name is derived from Caesar, but the route it took to Scandinavia is not clear. It may have been transmitted through a West Germanic language, but since Scandinavia and the Goths had close connections, it may also have been borrowed from the Gothic language and ultimately from Greek. The evolution of the name would have been καισαρ → kaisar → *kēsar → Kíarr → Kiárr. A third possibility is that it originates from contacts with Rome beside the probably early borrowing Rúm in words such as Rúmverjar ("Roman soldiers").

A less common theory is that it stems from Old Irish Kíarr or from Cearbhall of Valland (Wales).

See also
 Dukljan
 Karr (surname)

References

Heroes in Norse myths and legends
Julius Caesar
Roman emperors